The Vendsyssel railway line is a  long standard gauge single track railway line in Denmark which runs through the historical region of Vendsyssel between Aalborg and Frederikshavn in North Jutland. It constitutes the northernmost part of Den Østjyske Længdebane, the through route through the Jutland Peninsula from Padborg to Frederikshavn.

The section from Nørresundby to Frederikshavn opened in 1871. In 1879 the route was continued from Nørresundby to Aalborg across the Limfjord as the Limfjord Railway Bridge was inaugurated, thus connecting the Vendsyssel railway line with the Randers–Aalborg railway line as well as the rest of the Danish railway network.

The line is owned and maintained by the railway infrastructure manager Rail Net Denmark and served with passenger trains by the national railway company Danish State Railways (DSB) and local and freight trains by the regional railway company Nordjyske Jernbaner. The southernmost section from Aalborg to Lindholm is also served by the commuter rail service Aalborg Commuter Rail.

The line has three remaining branch lines: from Nørresundby the Aalborg Airport railway line branches west to Aalborg Airport, from Hjørring the Hirtshals railway line branches north to the town and ferry port of Hirtshals, and from Frederikshavn Skagen railway line branches north to the town and fishing port of Skagen.

History 

 
Work on the section from Nørresundby to Frederikshavn started in May 1869. It was opened on 16 August 1871 in the presence of King Christian IX. Passengers crossing the Limfjord, a shallow sound separating the North Jutlandic Island from the rest of the Jutland Peninsula, between Nørresundby station and Aalborg station had two opportunities: a ferry or crossing the pontoon bridge located further east on foot.

On 7 January 1879 the route was continued from Nørresundby to Aalborg as the Limfjord Railway Bridge spanning the Limfjord was inaugurated, and the Vendsyssel railway line was connected with the Randers–Aalborg railway line as well as the rest of the Danish railway network. In 1938, the original railway bridge was replaced by the current Limfjord Railway Bridge which was inaugurated on 23 April 1938.

In 1972, several stations (including Nørresundby, Sulsted and Tylstrup) were closed. In 2021, a new station Hjørring East was opened in the eastern part of Hjørring.

On 28 March 2012 the Limfjord railway bridge was hit by a ship and severely damaged so it was unusable for trains. For more than a year, there was no train service, only bus service, between Nørresundby and Aalborg until the bridge had been repaired and opened again for traffic on 29 April 2013. In 2017, the regional rail services on the Vendsyssel railway line were transferred from the national railway company DSB to the regional railway company Nordjyske Jernbaner.

Route 

From Nørresundby, the Aalborg Airport railway line branches west to Aalborg Airport. The main line passes west of Lindholm Høje and Hammer hills and continues north to Brønderslev and Hjørring. From Hjørring, the Hirtshals Line branches north to the town and ferry port of Hirtshals. The main line continues east, passing through Tolne hills to its terminus at Frederikshavn, located on the east coast of Vendsyssel. From Frederikshavn, the Skagen Line branches north to the town and fishing port of Skagen.

Operations 

The line is owned and maintained by the railway infrastructure manager Rail Net Denmark, a government agency under the Danish Ministry of Transport. It is served with InterCity and regional trains by the national railway company Danish State Railways (DSB) and local and freight trains by the regional railway company Nordjyske Jernbaner (NJ). Since 2003, the commuter rail service Aalborg Commuter Rail, operated by DSB, has also served the southernmost section from Aalborg to Lindholm.

Stations

References

Citations

Bibliography

Further reading

External links 

 Banedanmark – government agency responsible for maintenance and traffic control of most of the Danish railway network
 Nordjyske Jernbaner – Danish railway company operating in North Jutland Region
 DSB – largest Danish train operating company
 Nordjyllands Jernbaner – website with information on railway history in North Jutland
 Danske Jernbaner – website with information on railway history in Denmark

Railway lines in Denmark
Railway lines opened in 1871
1871 establishments in Denmark
Rail transport in the North Jutland Region